The Kosovo Police's Bomb Squad (IED/EOD) was established in March 2006, prompted by the necessity to protect citizens’ lives and property, and to assist in investigation of crime-related cases.

Bomb Squad is established at the KP Main Headquarters Level and is responsible to respond to the calls of all 8 Kosovo regions.
The bomb squad closely cooperates with investigation units and prosecutor's office in the course of post-blast investigations, after bomb threats and during arrest of persons who are in an illegal possession of explosive devices.

Current Capabilities
 Responding to cases of bomb threats
 Responding to CBRN
 Disposing and neutralizing all bombs
 Investigating post-blast incident scenes and providing assistance in reconstruction of explosive device following the blast, and preserving evidences
 Compiling experts report for the court
 Conducting searches in facilities involving High Risk
 Providing technical support to special operations, for example; SIU, V.I.P. and/or other Special searches.

Gallery

External links

 Bomb squad
 Home of the United States Marine Corps Explosive Ordnance Disposal Program
 International Association of Bomb Technicians and Investigators
 Royal Engineers Remembered - 9th Bomb Disposal Company
 USAF EOD US Air Force EOD Home page
 US Air Force Explosive Ordnance Disposal--Its Proud Beginning
 US NAVY EOD
 ROYAL AIR FORCE RAF Bomb Disposal
 Pigstick: Mondial Defence Systems Ltd. Pigstick Disruptor / Disarmer; MAnufactured by Mondial Defence Systesm, Poole, UK
 SM-EOD from Saab
 Aerial photo Army School of Ammunition IEDD Felix Centre

Military of Kosovo
Law enforcement in Kosovo

Emergency services
Mine action

da:Ammunitionsrydningstjenesten
de:Kampfmittelräumdienst
it:Artificiere
he:סילוק פצצות
ja:爆発物処理